Homegrown is a demo album by XTC, released a year after its parent album Wasp Star (Apple Venus Volume 2) on Idea Records and TVT Records. It was reissued in 2005 as part of the Apple Box.

Track listing

CD: IDEACD 004 
All songs written by Andy Partridge, except where noted.
"Playground" – 4:25
"Stupidly Happy" – 3:45
"In Another Life" (Excerpt of original demo) (Colin Moulding) – 2:02
"In Another Life" (Jug band version) (Moulding) – 3:44
"Some Lovely" – 3:57
"Boarded Up" (Moulding) – 2:56
"I'm the Man Who Murdered Love" (Early 'other song' cassette idea) – 2:36
"I'm the Man Who Murdered Love" (Tamla version excerpt) – 0:39
"I'm the Man Who Murdered Love" – 3:33
"We're All Light" (Early cassette idea) – 1:14
"We're All Light" – 4:32
"Standing in for Joe" (Lounge version) (Moulding) – 2:41
"Standing in for Joe" (Moulding) – 3:34
"Wounded Horse" – 4:22
"You and the Clouds Will Still Be Beautiful" – 3:46
"Lie for a Lie" (Cassette demo) – 1:43
"Church of Women" – 4:36
"The Pot Won't Hold Our Love" (Early cassette idea) – 1:38
"Everything Decays" (Early cassette idea) – 2:26
"The Wheel and the Maypole" – 5:33

Japanese edition bonus tracks
"Bumpercars" – 4:06
"Didn't Hurt a Bit" (Moulding) – 2:46

Personnel
XTC
Andy Partridge
Colin Moulding

2001 albums
TVT Records albums
XTC albums
Demo albums